Phaeophila is a genus of green algae in the family Phaeophilaceae.

References

External links

Ulvales
Ulvophyceae genera